Jerome Garrett Corbett (January 19, 1917 – October 20, 1997) was an American businessman, baseball player, and politician.

Corbett was born in Hardin, Illinois. He went to Hardin High School and then graduated from Routt Catholic High School in Jacksonville, Illinois. He served in the United States Army during World War II. Corbett went to Saint Louis University and the University of Illinois. He played semi-pro baseball for the St. Louis Browns. Corbett was an automobile dealer and lived in Hardin, Illinois. He was also a grain and livestock farmer. Corbett was also in the real estate business, Corbett served in the Illinois House of Representatives from 1969 to 1973 and was a Democrat. In 1973, Corbett was acquitted for violating the Illinois Purchasing Act concerning automobile sales involving the family automobile dealership. Corbett died at St. Mary's Health Center in Richmond Heights, Missouri.

Notes

External links

1917 births
1997 deaths
People from Calhoun County, Illinois
Military personnel from Illinois
Saint Louis University alumni
University of Illinois Urbana-Champaign alumni
St. Louis Browns players
Baseball players from Illinois
Businesspeople from Illinois
Farmers from Illinois
Democratic Party members of the Illinois House of Representatives
20th-century American politicians
20th-century American businesspeople
United States Army personnel of World War II